Fateh Khan Barech  or (Fateh Khan Dodai) a member of one of the most powerful families of Gujarati noblemen who probably came from Sindh.

History 
During the Mughal period, the two Baloch confederacies of Rind and Lashari (in eastern Balochistan and Punjab) remained allied with opposing powers. In the initial struggle between Emperor Humayun and Sher Shah Suri and later between Emperor Humayun and his brothers, the Rind appeared to be with Humayun, while Lashars chose to support Sher Shah and, later, the rebellious brothers of Humayun. During the confusion that followed the flight of Emperor Humayun to Persia, a pashtoon tribal union, headed by Fateh Khan Dodai, occupied Multan. However, after regaining the throne of India, he sent an army under the command of General Hebat Khan who, after a bloody battle, defeated the pashtoon, and the Mughals retook Multan. During the reigns of Emperor Akbar the Great and Emperor Shah Jahan, Balochistan was under firm Mughal control. According to Raverty (1888), during Akbar’s reign, the Mughal governor of Multan, Abdul Rahim Khan-I-Khana, sent many punitive expeditions against the Baloch. However, there is no mention of any significant encounter with the Baloch tribes during the reign of Emperor Jahangir.

For a short period, this Pashtoon confederacy was also able to occupy the prosperous region of Multan. As observed earlier, during the confusion that followed the flight of Mughal Emperor Humayun to Persia, the Pashtoon tribal union headed by Fateh Khan Dodai occupied Multan which was later retook by the Mughals Army under the command of General Hebat Khan on the orders of Emperor Humayun.

References

Sarbani Pashtun tribes
Barech